Fernanda Contreras Gómez (born October 8, 1997) is a Mexican tennis player. 
She has a career-high singles ranking of world No. 139 by the WTA, achieved on 3 October 2022, and a doubles ranking of world No. 110, achieved on 6 March 2023.
She played collegiately for Vanderbilt University.

College career
As a junior at Vanderbilt, Contreras won the USTA/ITA All-American Intercollegiate Championship to become Vanderbilt's first Riviera/ITA Singles Tournament Champion on 8 October 2017. She defeated Aliona Bolsova Zadoinov in the championship match.

Contreras finished the season with a 44–10 record, setting the program record for most victories in a season, and was named singles and doubles All-American. She reached the semifinals of the Oracle ITA Fall National Championships and the semifinals in the NCAA singles draw. Contreras ended her collegiate career with the most wins in Commodore history with 138 career wins.

Professional career

2018–2020
She made her debut for the Mexico Fed Cup team in 2018, winning all three matches she played.

Contreras also participated in the 2018 Central American and Caribbean Games with partner Giuliana Olmos taking gold in doubles and silver in team. She lost to reigning Olympic champion Monica Puig in singles before defeating Team Puerto Rico in doubles with Giuliana Olmos for the gold medal.

In February 2020, Contreras participated in the 2020 Fed Cup Americas Zone Group I – Play-offs, representing Mexico. After defeating Peru, Mexico beat Team Chile in the semifinals, squaring off to face Paraguay in the finals.  Mexico defeated Paraguay 2–1 securing their spot in the Fed Cup World Group Qualifiers. 
For her performance, Contreras was awarded the Fed Cup 2020 Americas Heart Award.

2022: Grand Slam & WTA debut and first wins, top 150
At the French Open, Contreras qualified for the main draw to make her Grand Slam tournament debut. She defeated Panna Udvardy in the first round for her first major and top-100 win.

She qualified for her second and third major in a row at Wimbledon and the US Open.

At the Pan Pacific Open, she earned her first main draw qualification in a WTA tournament and won against former top-10 player Sofia Kenin. As a result, she reached the top 150 in the rankings.

2023: First WTA Tour final & top 110 in doubles
Ranked No. 143 in doubles, she reached her first WTA doubles final at the 2023 Monterrey Open, partnering Kimberly Birrell after receiving a wildcard. As a result, she reached the top 110 in the rankings in doubles.

Personal life
Contreras was born in San Luis Potosí City, Mexico and grew up in Austin, Texas, where she attended Westlake High School.

Contreras graduated from Vanderbilt University in May 2019 with a degree in Mechanical Engineering. Her grandfather Francisco Contreras Serrano was a Davis Cup member, a Pan American Games medalist and a Wimbledon semi-finalist in mixed doubles.

Grand Slam performance
Only main-draw results in WTA Tour, Grand Slam tournaments, Fed Cup/Billie Jean King Cup and Olympic Games are included in win–loss records.

Singles
Current after the 2023 Monterrey Open.

WTA career finals

Doubles: 1 (runner-up)

ITF finals

Singles: 4 (2 titles, 2 runner–ups)

Doubles: 11 (8 titles, 3 runner–ups)

Head-to-head record

Record against top 10 players
Contreras Gómez's record against players who have been ranked in the top 10. Active players are in boldface.

Notes

References

External links
 
 
 

Living people
1997 births
Mexican female tennis players
Tennis players from Austin, Texas
Competitors at the 2018 Central American and Caribbean Games
Vanderbilt Commodores women's tennis players
Central American and Caribbean Games gold medalists for Mexico
Central American and Caribbean Games silver medalists for Mexico
Central American and Caribbean Games medalists in tennis
Sportspeople from San Luis Potosí
21st-century Mexican women